Caine Black Knife is a 2008 science fantasy novel by American writer Matthew Stover. It is labeled as the third of the Acts of Caine, and is act one of the Atonement story arc. It is published by the Ballantine Books  division of Del Rey. This is the third book in "The Acts of Caine" series, following Heroes Die and Blade of Tyshalle.

Setting
The story takes place on a futuristic Earth, and the parallel dimension world called Overworld. The futuristic Earth is a strictly caste-based society, the reason of which is explained in Blade of Tyshalle. After the discovery of Overworld, Actors are sent there to entertain Earth's population, by "putting their lives in danger in interesting ways". Overworld is a fantasy world, featuring an array of Tolkien-inspired races, such as primals/feys (elves), stonebenders (dwarves), ogrilloi (orcs), ogres, and trolls.

Summary
The novel is split between the adventure that made Caine a star (Retreat from the Boedecken) and events in the present day.  Both events take place in the same area, and both involve the Ogrillo Black Knife clan who roam the Boedecken Wastes.  A twenty-five-year gap separates the two timelines.

The arc was completed in Caine's Law (earlier working title: "His Father's Fist"), released April 2012.

Reception
Publishers Weekly gave the novel a somewhat mixed review saying, "Stover has a gift for brutal, detailed action sequences, and Caine is at his most enthralling when he's fighting or discussing tactics, but the high levels of (occasionally creative) profanity and the cliffhanger ending may put off some readers."

References

External links

mwstover.com

American fantasy novels
2008 science fiction novels
2008 American novels
Del Rey books
Dystopian novels
Science fantasy novels